Movistar Arena is a bus rapid transit station in Bogotá, Colombia. It is part of the TransMilenio mass-transit system of Bogotá, Colombia, opened in the year 2005.

Location
The station is located north of downtown Bogotá, specifically on Avenida NQS with Calle 63.

History
This station opened in 2005 as part of the second line of phase two of TransMilenio construction, opening service to Avenida NQS. It serves the demand of  Calle 63, and surrounding neighborhoods.

The station is named «Movistar Arena» due to its proximity to the multipurpose arena, which itself lies directly to the north of the stadium with the same name.

The station had the name Coliseo until September 28, 2018, when it changed to its current name after the remodeling of the place for events and the corresponding sponsorship.

Station Services

Old trunk services

Trunk services

Feeder routes
This station does not have connections to feeder routes.

Inter-city service
This station does not have inter-city service.

See also
 List of TransMilenio Stations

External links
 

TransMilenio